Tucumcari Mountain, once referred to as Tucumcari Peak or Mesa Tucumcari,  is a mesa situated just outside Tucumcari, New Mexico.

Where the mountain got its name is uncertain. It may have come from the Comanche word "tukamukaru", which means to lie in wait for someone or something to approach. A 1777 burial record mentions a Comanche woman and her child captured in a battle at Cuchuncari, which is believed to be an early version of the name Tucumcari.

Pedro Vial referred to the mountain in 1793, while opening a trail between Santa Fe and St. Louis. Captain Randolph B. Marcy led an expedition past it in 1849. The Swiss-American geologist Jules Marcou studied the geology of Tucumcari Mountain in 1853 and claimed that the Tucumcari strata were of Jurassic age.  The Texas geologist, Robert T. Hill, visited "Mesa Tucumcari" in 1887 and again in 1891, and eventually concluded that the Tucumcari strata were much younger Cretaceous deposits, not Jurassic as suggested by Marcou.  Also in 1891, William F. Cummins of the Geological Survey of Texas studied Tucumcari Mountain and his careful observations of the strata established beyond doubt the Cretaceous age of the Tucumcari beds.

The town of Tucumcari was founded in 1901 and, in 1908, took its name—both in real life and in legend—from the mountain. Residents of the town of Tucumcari have painted a hillside letter T on the mountain. A cartoon version of this mountain appears in Cars with 'RS' (for Radiator Springs) substituted for Tucumcari's 'T'.

See also

Canadian River
Caprock Escarpment
Eastern New Mexico
Llano Estacado
Lucianosaurus
Mescalero Ridge
Pecos River
Route 66

References

Tucumcari, New Mexico
Landforms of Quay County, New Mexico
Mesas of New Mexico
U.S. Route 66 in New Mexico
Hill figures in the United States